Parliamentary elections were held in Montenegro on 31 October 1907.

Background
The elections were boycotted by the People's Party (The Club members), which had complained of intimidation and claimed that they had been portrayed as hostile to Prince Nicholas. The offices of the People's Party's journal in Nikšić was wrecked on two occasions, whilst a café known to be a meeting place of People's Party members was also attacked. The newly-formed royalist True People's Party (The Rightists) were supported by the royal court and the army.

Aftermath
The newly elected National Assembly of Montenegro (parliament) met for the first time on 21 November 1907. Following the elections, 150 members of the boycotting People's Party (NS) were arrested for alleged treason.

References

Montenegro
1907 in Montenegro
Elections in Montenegro
October 1907 events